Lake Oahe is a large reservoir behind Oahe Dam on the Missouri River; it begins in central South Dakota and continues north into North Dakota in the United States. By volume, it is the fourth-largest reservoir in the US. The lake is named for the 1874 Oahe Indian Mission.

Lake Oahe begins just north of Pierre, South Dakota and extends nearly as far north as Bismarck, North Dakota. Mobridge, South Dakota is located on the eastern shore of the central portion of the lake. Bridges over Lake Oahe include US Route 212 west of Gettysburg, South Dakota and US Route 12 at Mobridge.  The former town of Forest City has been flooded beneath Lake Oahe, about 9 miles west of Gettysburg. Prehistoric archaeological sites have been explored in the area, including Molstad Village near Mobridge. It dates to before the emergence of the Arikara, Hidatsa and Mandan as separate peoples, and has been designated as a National Historic Landmark.

Recreation
Species of fish in the reservoir include walleye, northern pike, channel catfish, and smallmouth bass. Chinook salmon, native to the Pacific Northwest, are artificially maintained in Lake Oahe and are a popular target for anglers. The lake also supports populations of the endangered pallid sturgeon.

There are 50 public recreation areas that allow access to Lake Oahe. Many of these areas offer boat ramp facilities, marinas, campgrounds, picnic areas, hiking trails, along with access for hunting and fishing opportunities. Some of the recreation areas include: 
Oahe Downstream Recreation Area 
Cow Creek Recreation Area
Okobojo Point Recreation Area
West Whitlock Recreation Area 
Indian Creek Recreation Area 
Revheim Bay Recreation Area
West Pollock Recreation Area
Beaver Creek Recreation Area
Hazelton Recreation Area

Indian reservations and cultural resources

Both the Cheyenne River Indian Reservation and the Standing Rock Indian Reservation occupy much of the western shoreline of Lake Oahe. Two possible burial sites of Sitting Bull, a Sioux leader, are located along Lake Oahe. One is near Fort Yates, North Dakota, while the other is near Mobridge.

The shoreline and public lands around Lake Oahe contain various artifacts and cultural resources, especially important to many Native American tribes that have historically lived and traveled through the Missouri River Basin and the Lake Oahe area. All artifacts, including fossils and other objects are prohibited from collecting or damaging. The U.S. Army Corps of Engineers, along with other Federal and Tribal Law Enforcement officers enforce the unauthorized collection, vandalism, and damaging of culturally important sites and artifacts through the Antiquities Act, National Historic Preservation Act, Archaeological Resources Protection Act of 1979, and Native American Graves Protection and Repatriation Act. Penalties for violations can include fines, up to Federal prison sentences.

Forced relocation of Native Americans during construction 

In the 1960s, the Army Corps of Engineers and the Bureau of Reclamation built five large dams on the Missouri River, and implemented the Pick–Sloan Missouri Basin Program, forcing Native Americans to relocate from flooded areas. Over 200,000 acres on the Standing Rock Reservation and the Cheyenne River Reservation in South Dakota were flooded by the Oahe Dam alone. As of 2015, poverty remains a problem for the displaced populations in the Dakotas, who are still seeking compensation for the loss of the towns submerged under Lake Oahe, and the loss of their traditional ways of life.

Dakota Access Pipeline
Lake Oahe became a point of contention in protests to block the Dakota Access Pipeline. The construction project has been controversial for its environmental impacts, and several Native American tribes in the Dakotas and Iowa have opposed the project. These include several Sioux nations and the Meskwaki. In 2016 a group from the Standing Rock Indian Reservation brought a petition to the U.S. Army Corps of Engineers (USACE) and sued for an injunction to stop the project.

On December 4, 2016 USACE denied the easement that "would allow the Dakota Access Pipeline to cross under Lake Oahe" and Jo-Ellen Darcy, the United States Assistant Secretary of the Army "said she based her decision on a need to explore alternate routes for the Dakota Access Pipeline crossing."
Darcy said "that the consideration of alternative routes would be best accomplished through an Environmental Impact Statement with full public input and analysis."

Then-president Donald Trump soon thereafter issued "a memorandum and an executive order asking USACE to expedite its consideration of the company’s application for an easement to start construction."

The USACE subsequently "withdrew its call for the environmental study."

On 7 February 2017, the USACE approved an easement through Lake Oahe. On 9 February 2017, the Cheyenne River Sioux filed the first legal challenge to the easement, citing an 1851 treaty and interference with the religious practices of the tribe.

See also
 List of dams and reservoirs in North Dakota
 List of lakes in South Dakota

References

External links
Lake Oahe (Official website), U.S. Army Corps of Engineers (USACE)
Corps Lakes - Lake Oahe
South Dakota Department of Game, Fish, and Parks
North Dakota Department of Parks and Recreation
North Dakota Department of Game and Fish

Oahe
Oahe
Oahe
Protected areas of Burleigh County, North Dakota
Protected areas of Campbell County, South Dakota
Protected areas of Corson County, South Dakota
Protected areas of Dewey County, South Dakota
Protected areas of Emmons County, North Dakota
Protected areas of Hughes County, South Dakota
Protected areas of Morton County, North Dakota
Protected areas of Potter County, South Dakota
Protected areas of Sioux County, North Dakota
Protected areas of Stanley County, South Dakota
Protected areas of Sully County, South Dakota
Protected areas of Walworth County, South Dakota
Buildings and structures in Burleigh County, North Dakota
Buildings and structures in Campbell County, South Dakota
Buildings and structures in Corson County, South Dakota
Buildings and structures in Dewey County, South Dakota
Buildings and structures in Emmons County, North Dakota
Buildings and structures in Hughes County, South Dakota
Buildings and structures in Morton County, North Dakota
Buildings and structures in Potter County, South Dakota
Buildings and structures in Sioux County, North Dakota
Buildings and structures in Stanley County, South Dakota
Buildings and structures in Sully County, South Dakota
Buildings and structures in Walworth County, South Dakota
Bodies of water of Burleigh County, North Dakota
Bodies of water of Campbell County, South Dakota
Bodies of water of Corson County, South Dakota
Bodies of water of Dewey County, South Dakota
Bodies of water of Emmons County, North Dakota
Bodies of water of Hughes County, South Dakota
Bodies of water of Morton County, North Dakota
Bodies of water of Potter County, South Dakota
Bodies of water of Sioux County, North Dakota
Bodies of water of Stanley County, South Dakota
Bodies of water of Sully County, South Dakota
Bodies of water of Walworth County, South Dakota